The Antiochian Orthodox Christian Archdiocese of North America (AOCANA), often referred to in North America as simply the Antiochian Archdiocese, is the jurisdiction of the Greek Orthodox Church of Antioch in the United States and Canada. Originally under the care of the Russian Orthodox Church, the Syro-Levantine Eastern Orthodox Christian immigrants to the United States and Canada were granted their own jurisdiction under the Church of Antioch in the wake of the Bolshevik Revolution. Internal conflicts divided the Antiochian Orthodox faithful into two parallel archdiocesesthose of New York and Toledountil 1975, when Metropolitan Philip (Saliba) became the sole Archbishop of the reunited Antiochian Archdiocese. By 2014, the archdiocese had grown to over 275 parish churches.

It is one of two Orthodox Christian jurisdictions in North America to currently practice the liturgical Western Rite as well as the Byzantine Rite, along with the Russian Orthodox Church Outside of Russia.

History
The Antiochian Orthodox followers were originally cared for by the Russian Orthodox Church in America and the first bishop consecrated in North America, Saint Raphael of Brooklyn, was consecrated by the Russian Orthodox Church in America in 1904 to care for the Syro-Levantine Greek Orthodox Christian Ottoman immigrants to the United States and Canada, who had come chiefly from the vilayets of Adana, Aleppo, Damascus, and Beirut (the birthplace of the community's founder, Saint Raphael of Brooklyn).

After the Bolshevik Revolution threw the Russian Orthodox Church and its faithful abroad into chaos, the Syro-Levantine Greek Orthodox Christian faithful in North America, simultaneously shaken by the death of their beloved bishop, Saint Raphael, chose to come under the direct care of the Damascus-based Patriarchate of Antioch. Due to internal conflicts, however, the Antiochian Orthodox faithful in North America became divided between two archdioceses, those of New York City and Toledo.

In 1975, the two Antiochian Orthodox archdioceses were united as one Archdiocese of North America (now with its headquarters in Englewood, New Jersey). Since then, it has experienced significant growth through ongoing evangelization of North Americans and the immigration of Orthodox Christian Arabs from the Middle East. Its leader from 1966 until 2014 was Metropolitan Philip Saliba. Six other diocesan bishops assisted the metropolitan in caring for the archdiocese, which is the third largest Orthodox Christian jurisdiction in North America, with 74,600 adherents in the United States, 27,300 of whom are regular church attendees. As of 2011, it also has 249 parishes in the United States with two monastic communities.

Metropolitan Philip died in 2014 and was succeeded by Metropolitan Joseph Al-Zehlaoui. Metropolitan Joseph retired in 2022 following allegations of sexual misconduct. 

The archdiocese is a participating member of the Assembly of Canonical Orthodox Bishops of the United States of America. Metropolitan Joseph served as the body's first vice chairman.

Structure
The archdiocese is divided in eight territorial dioceses and one vicariate. Some of the territorial dioceses extend into Canada.

 Charleston, Oakland, and the Mid-Atlantic (chancery in Charleston, West Virginia)
 Los Angeles and the West (chancery in Los Angeles, California)
 Miami and the Southeast (chancery in Coral Gables, Florida)
 New York and Washington, D.C. (chancery in Englewood, New Jersey)
 Ottawa, Eastern Canada and Upstate New York (chancery in Montreal, Canada)
 Toledo and the Midwest (chancery in Toledo, Ohio)
 Wichita and Mid-America (chancery in Wichita, Kansas)
 Worcester and New England (chancery in Worcester, Massachusetts).

Alongside the eight Byzantine Rite territorial dioceses exists the Western Rite Vicariate, a non-territorial vicariate created from remnants of the Society of Saint Basil in 1961, three years after the Western Rite was approved for use by the archdiocese in 1958. It oversees all Antiochian parishes serving the Roman or Anglican uses of the Western Rite, as opposed to the Byzantine Rite used by the majority of the archdiocese.

Evangelism

Many conservative former Anglicans have turned to the archdiocese as a jurisdiction, some joining and leading Western Rite parishes with liturgy more familiar to Western Christians. The current mission of the Antiochian Orthodox Christian Archdiocese of North America is to "bring Orthodoxy to America. Its Department of Missions and Evangelism was chaired by Fr.Peter Gillquist who led the mass conversion of the Evangelical Orthodox Church to Eastern Orthodoxy. The current chairman is Fr.John Finley.

The archdiocese also includes Ancient Faith Ministries among its departments, with its well-known Ancient Faith Radio division, an Internet-based radio station with content themed around Orthodox Christianity, including both streaming stations and more than 100 podcasts.

Relations with other Christian bodies

Episcopacy

While American converts play a substantial role in the life of the archdiocese, being well represented among both clergy and laity, all bishops of the Antiochian Archdiocese are of Levantine descent.

Metropolitan Archbishop
 His Eminence, the Most Reverend Saba Esper, Archbishop of New York and Metropolitan of the Antiochian Orthodox Christian Archdiocese of North America.

Auxiliary bishops
 Bishop Basil (Essey), Wichita Chancery
 Bishop Thomas (Joseph), Charleston Chancery
 Bishop Alexander (Mufarrij), Ottawa Chancery
 Bishop John (Abdallah), Worcester Chancery
 Bishop Anthony (Michaels), Toledo Chancery
 Bishop Nicholas (Ozone), Miami Chancery

Former Metropolitan Archbishops

Archdiocese of New York
 Metropolitan Victor (Abo-Assaley), 19241935
 Metropolitan Anthony (Bashir), 19361966
 Metropolitan Philip (Saliba), 19662014

Archdiocese of Toledo
 Metropolitan Samuel (David), 19361958
 Metropolitan Michael (Shaheen), 19581975

Archdiocese of New York and All North America
 Metropolitan Philip (Saliba), 19752014
 Metropolitan Joseph (Al-Zehlaoui), 2014 2022

See also
 Assembly of Canonical Orthodox Bishops of the United States of America
 Standing Conference of Orthodox Bishops in America
 Greek Orthodox Patriarchate of Antioch
 Antiochian Greek Christians
 Philip (Saliba)

Notes

1.The number of adherents given in the "Atlas of American Orthodox Christian Churches" is defined as "individual full members" with the addition of their children. It also includes an estimate of how many are not members but regularly participate in parish life. Regular attendees includes only those who regularly attend church and regularly participate in church life.

References

External links
 
 Antiochian Orthodox Christian Archdiocese of North America (OrthodoxWiki article)

Antiochian Orthodox Church in the United States
Christian organizations established in 1924
Dioceses established in the 20th century
Eastern Orthodox Church bodies in North America
Eastern Orthodox dioceses in Canada
Eastern Orthodox dioceses in the United States
Eastern Orthodox organizations established in the 20th century
Greek Orthodox Church of Antioch